Jan Dunn (born 15 May 1963 in Maidenhead, Berkshire, England) is a British filmmaker, who made her feature length directorial debut in 2005 with the film Gypo, starring Paul McGann and Pauline McLynn, which won a British Independent Film Award for Best Production. Although Dogme 95 was dissolved in 2005, it was the first film to be made as post-Dogme under the rules.

Her next film Ruby Blue, starring British actor Bob Hoskins and French actress Josiane Balasko was released in UK cinemas in 2008.

She wrote and directed her third feature film, The Calling, starring Brenda Blethyn, Susannah York, Rita Tushingham, Pauline McLynn and Amanda Donohoe, released in UK cinemas 2010. For her debut leading performance in the film, Emily Beacham was awarded a new talent trailblazer award presented by Sean Connery during the film's debut, where it was also selected as 'Best of the Fest' at the 2009 Edinburgh International Film Festival.

Filmography
Feature films:
 Gypo 2005  (writer/director/executive producer)
 Ruby Blue 2007 (writer/director)
 The Calling 2009 (writer/director)
Shorts:
 The Lumber-jills 1996 (director)
 Mary's Date 1999 (producer/director)
 Joan 2000 (producer/director)
 Dora 2001 (producer/director)

Awards
 British Independent Film Awards 2005 – Gypo Outstanding Achievement in Production
 Political Film Festival Barcelona 2005 – Gypo Jan Dunn special jury mention
 San Francisco International LGBT Film Festival FRAMELINE 2005 – Gypo Best First Feature
 Washington DC International Film Festival 2008 – Ruby Blue Grand Jury Prize Best Film
 London Independent Film Festival 2008 – Ruby Blue Best British Film
 Moondance International Film Festival 2008 – Ruby Blue Spirit of Moondance Award Best Director
 Chicago International LGBT International Film Festival 2008 – Ruby Blue Audience Award Best Feature Film

References

External links

1963 births
Living people
British film directors
People from Maidenhead